In mathematics, coarse space may refer to
 
Coarse structure, a family of sets in geometry and topology to measure large-scale properties of a space
Coarse space (numerical analysis), a reduced representation of a numerical problem